Mississippi Highway 17 (MS 17) is a state highway in central Mississippi.

Route description

MS 17 begins in rural Madison County near the community of Farmhaven at an intersection with MS 16, with the road continuing south into the community as Summerlin Road. The highway winds its way north, then northwest, through mostly wooded areas for several miles, where it has an intersection with MS 43 before passing through Camden. It continues northeast through rural areas for several more miles to come to an intersection and become concurrent (overlapped) with US 51, and they head north to cross the Big Black River into Yazoo County.

US 51/MS 17 immediately enter the Pickens city limits and have an intersection with MS 432 before entering Holmes County passing straight through town, bypassing downtown along its west side. MS 17 splits off and heads northwest at the northern edge of town and it leaves Pickens to have an interchange with I-55 (Exit 144). The highway turns northward and travels through a mix of farmland and woodlands for several miles, passing through Richland, where it has a short concurrency with MS 14, and Franklin, before entering the Lexington city limits. MS 17 enters town along Yazoo Street and passes through neighborhoods, where it has an intersection with MS 836 (Lexington Bypass), before entering downtown and traveling through a traffic circle (roundabout) around the Holmes County Courthouse, where it becomes concurrent with MS 12 (Depot Street). They head north along Carrollton Street to leave downtown and pass through neighborhoods, where MS 12 splits off and heads toward Tchula and the Mississippi Delta at a Y-Intersection. MS 17 leaves Lexington and travels through rural areas for several miles, crossing over several small creeks as it passes through Acona before entering Carroll County.

MS 17 heads north through mostly woodlands as passes through Blackhawk, where it has an intersection with MS 430, and Coila before having an intersection with US 82 (where it becomes concurrent with MS 35) and entering Carrollton. MS 17/MS 35 head straight through downtown along Lexington Street before crossing the Big Sand Creek into neighboring North Carrollton. They pass through town along George Street before the two highways split at an intersection with Main Street in downtown, with MS 35 turning left onto Main Street with MS 17 turns right. Main Street becomes Front Street as MS 17 enters neighborhoods, where it makes a left to cross over railroad tracks onto Jefferson Street. It follows Jefferson Street north to the northern edge of the city limits, where state maintenance (and MS 17) ends and the road continues north as Carroll County Road 17 (CR 17, a.k.a. Grenada Road).

The entire length of Mississippi Highway 17 is a two-lane rural highway.

Major intersections

References

External links

Magnolia Meanderings

017
Transportation in Madison County, Mississippi
Transportation in Yazoo County, Mississippi
Transportation in Holmes County, Mississippi
Transportation in Carroll County, Mississippi